A special election was held in  on August 25, 1800, and October 20, 1800, to fill a vacancy left by the resignation of Dwight Foster (F) after his election to the Senate, the second election required because the first did not result in a majority.

Election results

Lincoln took his seat on February 6, 1801.

See also
List of special elections to the United States House of Representatives

References

United States House of Representatives 1800 04
Massachusetts 04
Massachusetts 1800 04
1800 04
Massachusetts 04
United States House of Representatives 04